Ratna Singh (born 29 April 1959) is an Indian politician, daughter of former minister Dinesh Singh. She has been elected MP from Pratapgarh to Lok Sabha thrice as from Congress party in 1996, 1999 and 2009. But after coming third in two consecutive Lok Sabha election (2014 and 2019) on Congress ticket, she left to join Bharatiya Janata Party in October 2019.

Career
She had won from Pratapgarh in 1999, but lost the 2004 elections to Akshay Pratap Singh alias Gopalji, Ratna and Raghuraj Pratap Singh are both related to the but hail from different branches.

Ratna Singh regained the Pratapgarh constituency in the 2009 Indian general elections, defeating her nearest Samajwadi Party rival Prof. Shivakant Ojha, by over 30,000 votes. Akshay Pratap Singh came in third, and fourth was the noted criminal-politician Ateeq Ahmed who was fighting the elections from prison.  Partly, her victory has been attributed to a re-allocation of the boundaries of the electoral district, whereby  Raja Bhaiya's Kunda district was re-apportioned to a separate area.

Subsequently, in the 2014 Indian general elections she was defeated by Harivansh Singh of Apna Dal.

References

External links
 Lok Sabha Profile Govt. of India website
 Biographical Sketch:Member of Parliament at Parliament of India website.

1959 births
Living people
People from Pratapgarh, Uttar Pradesh
Delhi University alumni
Indian National Congress politicians from Uttar Pradesh
India MPs 1996–1997
India MPs 2009–2014
India MPs 1999–2004
Women in Uttar Pradesh politics
Lok Sabha members from Uttar Pradesh
Articles created or expanded during Women's History Month (India) - 2014
United Progressive Alliance candidates in the 2014 Indian general election
20th-century Indian women politicians
20th-century Indian politicians
21st-century Indian women politicians
21st-century Indian politicians
Bharatiya Janata Party politicians from Uttar Pradesh